Barry Ricardo Forde (born 17 September 1976) is a former Barbadian track cyclist. Forde was banned for two years and two months after testing positive for Testosterone on 28 October 2005.

He returned to competition after his ban, but Forde later failed a urine test for Erythropoietin (EPO) in September 2010. Forde was given a UCI Life Ban and as a result announced his retirement in March 2011.

He currently resides and works in Berlin Germany with his wife, interior designer Ji-Young Choi-Forde.

Palmarès 

2001
 Pan American Championships, Medellin
 , Sprint

2002
 2002 Pan American Championships, Quito
 , Keirin
 , Sprint

2003
 World Championships, Stuttgart
 , Keirin
 Pan American Games
 , Sprint & Keirin (Disqualified)
 Pan American Championships
 , Sprint

2005
 World Championships, Los Angeles
 , Keirin
 Pan American Championships, Mar del Plata
 , Keirin
 , Sprint

2008
 World Cup
 3rd, Keirin, Cali

References

External links 
 
 
 

1976 births
Living people
Barbadian male cyclists
Barbadian track cyclists
Olympic cyclists of Barbados
Cyclists at the 2004 Summer Olympics
Commonwealth Games medallists in cycling
Commonwealth Games bronze medallists for Barbados
Cyclists at the 1998 Commonwealth Games
Cyclists at the 2002 Commonwealth Games
Cyclists at the 2010 Commonwealth Games
Pan American Games competitors for Barbados
Cyclists at the 1999 Pan American Games
Cyclists at the 2003 Pan American Games
Central American and Caribbean Games medalists in cycling
Central American and Caribbean Games gold medalists for Barbados
Competitors at the 1998 Central American and Caribbean Games
People from Saint James, Barbados
Doping cases in cycling
Medallists at the 1998 Commonwealth Games